The Whetstone benchmark is a synthetic benchmark for evaluating the performance of computers. It was first written in Algol 60 in 1972 at the Technical Support Unit of the Department of Trade and Industry (later part of the Central Computer and Telecommunications Agency) in the United Kingdom. It was derived from statistics on program behaviour gathered on the KDF9 computer at NPL National Physical Laboratory, using a modified version of its Whetstone ALGOL 60 compiler. The workload on the machine was represented as a set of frequencies of execution of the 124 instructions of the Whetstone Code. The Whetstone Compiler was built at the Atomic Power Division of the English Electric Company in Whetstone, Leicestershire, England, hence its name. Dr. B.A. Wichman at NPL produced a set of 42 simple ALGOL 60 statements, which in a suitable combination matched the execution statistics.

To make a more practical benchmark Harold Curnow of TSU wrote a program incorporating the 42 statements. This program worked in its ALGOL 60 version, but when translated into FORTRAN it was not executed correctly by the IBM optimizing compiler. Calculations whose results were not output were omitted. He then produced a set of program fragments which were more like real code and which collectively matched the original 124 Whetstone instructions. Timing this program gave a measure of the machine’s speed in thousands of Whetstone instructions per second. The Fortran version became the first general purpose benchmark that set industry standards of computer system performance. Further development was carried out by Roy Longbottom, also of TSU/CCTA, who became the official design authority. The Algol 60 program ran under the Whetstone compiler in July 2010, for the first time since the last KDF9 was shut down in 1980, but now executed by a KDF9 emulator. Following increased computer speeds, performance measurement was changed to Millions of Whetstone Instructions Per Second (MWIPS).

Source code and pre-compiled versions for PCs in C/C++, Basic, Visual Basic, Fortran and Java are available.

The Whetstone benchmark primarily measures the floating-point arithmetic performance. A similar benchmark for integer and string operations is the Dhrystone.

See also
 Dhrystone
 FLOPS
 Gibson Mix
 LINPACK benchmarks
 Million instructions per second (MIPS)

References

External links 
 Benchmark Programs and Reports (see also Netlib)
 Whetstone Algol Revisited, or Confessions of a compiler writer PDF file (B. Randell, 1964)

Benchmarks (computing)
Blaby
Computer-related introductions in 1972
History of computing in the United Kingdom
Science and technology in Leicestershire